A  is a government-designated rest area found along roads and highways in Japan.

In addition to providing places for travelers to rest, they are intended to promote local tourism and trade.  Shops may sell local produce, snacks, souvenirs, and other goods. All roadside stations provide 24-hour access to parking, public toilets and facilities for sharing information. 

As of February 2020, there are 1,160 Roadside Stations across Japan: 125 in Hokkaido, 163 in the Tohoku-area, 178 in the Kanto-area, 80 in the Hokuriku-area, 134 in the Chubu-area, 147 in the Kinki-area, 104 in the Chugoku-area, 87 in the Shikoku-area, 142 in the Kyushu- and Okinawa-areas.

References

External links

 Michi-no-eki official website
 Japan Road Bureau website
Flickr photos 道の駅 (Michi-no-eki)

Rest areas
Road transport in Japan
Japanese culture